Uluscherga (Ulus-Çargı) is a rural locality (a selo) and the administrative centre of Uluscherginskoye Rural Settlement, Shebalinsky District, the Altai Republic, Russia. The population was 301 as of 2016. There are 6 streets.

Geography 
Uluscherga is located 49 km northwest of Shebalino (the district's administrative centre) by road. Cherga is the nearest rural locality.

References 

Rural localities in Shebalinsky District